Sautens is a municipality in the Imst district located  southeast of Imst on the lower course of the Ötztaler Ache. The village is located to catch the sun but is protected from the wind, which makes for an especially mild climate. The main source of income is agriculture.  Fruit is especially important with a good part of the harvest used to make Schnapps.

The name of the village appears to originate from Roman times. Sautens was once connected with Oetz but became its own community in 1836. Recently the village has experienced increasing tourism.

Population

References

External links

Cities and towns in Imst District